Holcocerus zarudnyi is a moth in the family Cossidae. It is found in southern Iran.

References

Natural History Museum Lepidoptera generic names catalog

Cossinae
Moths described in 1902
Moths of Asia